
Gmina Bircza is a rural gmina (administrative district) in Przemyśl County, Subcarpathian Voivodeship, in south-eastern Poland.

Neighbouring gminas
Gmina Bircza is bordered by the gminas of Dubiecko, Dydnia, Dynów, Fredropol, Krasiczyn, Krzywcza, Nozdrzec, Olszanica, Sanok, Tyrawa Wołoska and Ustrzyki Dolne.

Villages
Gmina Bircza contains the following villages:
 Bircza
 Boguszówka
 Borownica
 Brzeżawa
 Brzuska
 Dobrzanka
 Huta Brzuska
 Jasienica Sufczyńska
 Jawornik Ruski
 Korzeniec
 Kotów
 Krajna
 Kuźmina
 Leszczawa Dolna
 Leszczawa Górna
 Leszczawka
 Lipa
 Łodzinka Dolna
 Łodzinka Górna
 Łomna
 Malawa
 Nowa Wieś
 Roztoka
 Rudawka
 Stara Bircza
 Sufczyna
 Wola Korzeniecka
 Żohatyn

References

Polish official population figures 2006

External links
Gmina Bircza official website
Bircza Online - Genealogy and research website for Bircza and its environs

Bircza
Przemyśl County